The Wodiwodi also pronounced Whardi Whardi (according to an interview with Joan Mc Grady- early 1990s) peoples are the Indigenous Australian people of New South Wales, a sub-group of the Dharawal nation.

Language
The Wodiwodi language, considered a dialect of Tharawal was briefly described by William Ridley in 1875, who obtained this information, via her husband, from the wife of John Malone, Lizzie Malone, whose mother was a Shoalhaven Indigenous person.

Country
district, including Lake Illawarra, Berkeley and Hooka Creek. Their descendants are considered one of the custodians of the land in this area.

Mythology
The Wodiwodi word for the creator figure called Baiame by contiguous tribes, was Mirrirul, from the word mirīr, meaning "sky."

Alternative spellings and names
 Woddi Woddi
Whardi Whardi
 Illawarra (a regional name)

Some words
 būnbāri (boy)
 būrrū (kangaroo)
 jiruŋgaluŋ (white man)
 kudjaguz (child)
 mirriguŋ (dog)

Landscape features
The Wodi Wodi Walking Track, Stanwell Park, New South Wales is named after the Wodiwodi people.

Notes

Citations

Sources

Aboriginal peoples of New South Wales